Zanclognatha protumnusalis, the conifer zanclognatha, is a litter moth of the family Erebidae. It was described by Francis Walker in 1859. It is found from southern Canada to Florida and Texas.

Adults are on wing from July to September. There is one generation in the north. There is a partial second generation in New Jersey and two or more broods in the south.

Larvae are found on Atlantic white cedar, balsam fir, black spruce, jack pine and white spruce. They probably feed on lichen, algae and detritus within the trees.

If disturbed, the larvae fake death by rolling on their side, partially curling their body. They remain motionless in this position.

External links
Images
BugGuide

protumnusalis
Moths of North America
Taxa named by Francis Walker (entomologist)
Moths described in 1859